Osceola Municipal Airport  is a city-owned public-use airport located four nautical miles (5 mi, 7 km) northeast of the central business district of Osceola, a city in Clarke County, Iowa, United States. It is included in the National Plan of Integrated Airport Systems for 2011–2015, which categorized it as a general aviation facility.

Facilities and aircraft 
Osceola Municipal Airport covers an area of 81 acres (33 ha) at an elevation of 1,115 feet (340 m) above mean sea level. It has one runway designated 18/36 with a concrete surface measuring 4,001 by 75 feet (1,220 x 23 m).

For the 12-month period ending June 21, 2010, the airport had 5,750 general aviation 
aircraft operations, an average of 15 per day. At that time there were 27 aircraft based at this airport: 93% single-engine and 7% ultralight.

References

External links 
 Osceola Municipal (I75) at Iowa DOT Airport Directory
 Aerial image as of April 1994 from USGS The National Map
 

Airports in Iowa
Osceola, Iowa
Transportation buildings and structures in Clarke County, Iowa